The slaty becard (Pachyramphus spodiurus) is a species of bird in the family Tityridae. It has traditionally been placed in Cotingidae or Tyrannidae, but evidence strongly suggest it is better placed in Tityridae, where it is now placed by the South American Classification Committee.

Distribution and habitat
It is found in Ecuador and far northern Peru. Its natural habitat is subtropical or tropical dry forests.

Conservation
They have a decreasing population and are endangered according to the IUCN red list. Threats include the increase in urban areas, farming and deforestation. The population is fragmented. However, they occur in some protected areas. There are between 600 and 1700 mature birds.

Description 
They have grey plumage. Their breast is a rather pale shade of grey. They have a black eye and dark grey beak.

References

External links
BirdLife Species Factsheet.

slaty becard
Birds of Ecuador
Birds of the Tumbes-Chocó-Magdalena
slaty becard
slaty becard]
Taxonomy articles created by Polbot